Ram Lakhan Mahato (27 July 1947 – 31 January 2020) was an Indian politician from Bihar belonging to Janata Dal (United). He was a member of the Bihar Legislative Assembly. He was a minister of the Government of Bihar too.

Biography
Mahato was elected as a member of the Bihar Legislative Assembly from Dalsinghsarai in 1995 as a Janata Dal candidate. He was appointed Food and Supplies Minister of the Government of Bihar in 1996.

Mahato was elected from Dalsinghsarai in October 2005 as a Rashtriya Janata Dal candidate. He joined Janata Dal (United) in 2010.

Mahato died on 31 January 2020 at the age of 72.

References

1947 births
2020 deaths
Janata Dal politicians
Rashtriya Janata Dal politicians
Janata Dal (United) politicians
People from Samastipur district
Bihar MLAs 1995–2000
Bihar MLAs 2005–2010
State cabinet ministers of Bihar